Senator Gerlach may refer to:

Chris Gerlach (born 1964), Minnesota State Senate
Jim Gerlach (born 1955), Pennsylvania State Senate